The economy of Kazakhstan is the largest in Central Asia in both absolute and per capita terms. Kazakhstan has attracted to 2021 more than US$370 billion of foreign investments since becoming an independent republic after the collapse of the former Soviet Union.

It possesses oil reserves as well as minerals and metals. It also has considerable agricultural potential, with its vast steppe lands accommodating both livestock and grain production. The mountains in the south are important for apples and walnuts; both species grow wild there. Kazakhstan's industrial sector rests on the extraction and processing of these natural resources.

The Dissolution of the Soviet Union and the collapse of demand for Kazakhstan's traditional heavy industry products have resulted in a sharp decline of the economy since 1991, with the steepest annual decline occurring in 1994. In 1995–97 the pace of the government program of economic reform and privatization quickened, resulting in a substantial shifting of assets into the private sector. Kazakhstan was granted "market economy country" status by the European Union and the United States, in 2000 and 2002 respectively.

The December 1996 signing of the Caspian Pipeline Consortium agreement to build a new pipeline from western Kazakhstan's Tengiz Field through Russia to the Black Sea increased prospects for substantially larger oil exports until Putin took issue with the lukewarm support he experienced in the wake of the 2022 Russian invasion of Ukraine from Kazakh President Kassym-Jomart Tokayev. Kazakhstan's economy turned downward in 1998 with a 2.5% decline in GDP growth due to slumping oil prices and the August financial crisis in Russia. A bright spot in 1999 was the recovery of international petroleum prices, which, combined with a well-timed tenge devaluation and a bumper grain harvest, pulled the economy out of recession.

GDP per capita shrank by 26% in the 1990s. In the 2000s, Kazakhstan's economy grew sharply, aided by increased prices on world markets for Kazakhstan's leading exports: oil, metals and grain. GDP grew 9.6% in 2000, up from 1.7% in 1999. In 2006, extremely high GDP growth had been sustained, and grew by 10.6%. Business with the booming economies of Russia and China, as well as neighboring Commonwealth of Independent States (CIS) nations have helped to propel this growth.  The increased economic growth also led to a turn-around in government finances, with the budget moving from a cash deficit of 3.7% of GDP in 1999 to 0.1% surplus in 2000. The country experienced a slowdown in economic growth from 2014, sparked by falling oil prices and the effects of the Russo-Ukrainian War. The country's currency was devalued by 19% in 2014 and by 22% in 2015.

In 2017, the World Economic Forum compiled its Global Competitiveness Ranking, ranking Kazakhstan 57th out of 144 countries. The ranking considers multiple macroeconomic and financial factors, such as market size, GDP, tax rates, infrastructure development, etc. In 2012, the World Economic Forum listed corruption as the biggest problem in doing business in the country, while the World Bank listed Kazakhstan as a corruption hotspot, on a par with Angola, Bolivia, Kenya, Libya and Pakistan. Kazakhstan scored 31 points out of 100 in Transparency International's 2018 edition of the Corruption Perceptions Index, indicating high levels of corruption.

Cyril Muller, the World Bank Vice President for Europe and Central Asia, visited Astana in January 2017. He praised the country's progress, made during the 25-year partnership with the World Bank. Muller also talked about Kazakhstan's improved positioning in the World Bank's Doing Business Report 2017, where Kazakhstan ranked 35th out of 190 countries worldwide. After 2000, the government conducted several public sector reforms and adopted the New Public Management (NPM) approach, which was aimed at reducing costs and increasing the efficiency of the public service delivery.

Kazakhstan secured the 3rd position in the Central and South Asia regional ranking of the 2018 Global Innovation Index (GII) released by World Intellectual Property Organization.

Macro-economic trend

In the 2014 Economic Freedom Index published by The Heritage Foundation in Washington, DC, Kazakhstan has gained 22 points over the past 17 years, which is noted by the authors as among the 20 best improvements recorded by any country. Kazakhstan's economic freedom score is 69.1, equalling "moderately free". Its overall score has increased by 0.1 point, with significant improvements in investment freedom and government integrity offsetting steep declines in fiscal health and monetary freedom. Kazakhstan is ranked 11th among 43 countries in the Asia–Pacific region, and its overall score is above the regional and world averages.

This chart shows trends in the gross domestic product of Kazakhstan at market prices estimated by the International Monetary Fund, with figures in millions of tenge.

The following table shows the main economic indicators in 1980–2017. Inflation under 5% is in green.

Economic growth and GDP 
Kazakhstan's GDP grew 4.1% in real terms during the period from January to September 2011.

Kazakhstan's real GDP growth was projected to reach 4.3% in 2014, the main driving force of the economy in Kazakhstan in 2014 is the consumer sector; the consumption in Kazakhstan is mainly boosted by the retail lending.

According to the Agency of Statistics of the Republic of Kazakhstan the country's GDP growth in the first quarter of 2014 was 3.8%.

The country devalued its currency by 19% in February 2014. The country experienced a slowdown in economic growth from 2014 sparked by falling oil prices and the effects of the 2014 Russo-Ukrainian War.

The Government of Kazakhstan signed a Framework Partnership Agreement with IBRD, IFC, MIGA on 1 May 2014; according to this Agreement the World Bank will allocate US$2.5 trillion to Kazakhstan, for the diversification of the economy and reaching the sustainable development.

The World Bank report shows that Kazakhstan, as of 2015, reached the level of an upper-middle-income country with a GDP of US$170 billion.

Another 22% devaluation occurred in August 2015.

Foreign direct investment increased 30 percent in 2015 in Kazakhstan's agricultural industry and 80 percent in the country's petroleum products sector.

In 2016 Kazakhstan's economy started to recover from the crisis caused by low oil prices and the tenge devaluation. According to the Minister of National Economy of Kazakhstan, in nine months of 2016 the GDP growth reached 0.4%. Sectors of economy that experienced the highest growth included construction (6.9%), agriculture (4.9%), and transport sector (4.0%).

The GDP per capita in current US$ in Kazakhstan declined by about 40% between 2013 compared and 2017.

Kazakhstan was ranked 25th out of 190 countries in the World Bank's Doing Business 2020 report. The country improved its position by 3 points, from 28 to 25, in the 2020 ranking compared to the previous year. This placed Kazakhstan ahead of countries such as Iceland (26th place), Austria (27th place), Russia (28th place), Japan (29th place), etc.

Kazakhstan has prioritized the development of non-oil sectors of economy, which accounted for 85% of the country's economic growth in 2019.

In the first seven months of 2020, Kazakhstan exported significantly more goods than the previous year, including a seven-fold increase in automobile exports. The country's GDP decreased by 3 percent due to the decline in the service sector because of the COVID-19 pandemic, but the real sector of the economy grew significantly. Agriculture, construction, and manufacturing all saw increases in production in the first eight months of the year.

The biggest growth in 2020 occurred in the automotive industry (+53.6%), pharmaceuticals (+39.7%), processed metal products (+19.5%), mechanical engineering (+16.5%), as well as in light industry (+16.4%). The industries in the service sector that demonstrated growth included construction (+10.7%) and information and communications (+8.2%).

Sectors of economy

Primary

Energy
Kazakhstan is the leading country in the world for uranium production volumes with 35% of global production, and it has the world's second biggest uranium reserves after Australia.

Oil and gas

Oil and gas is the leading economic sector. In 2000, Kazakhstan produced 35,252,000 metric tons of oil (700,000 barrels per day), a 17.4% increase over 1999's 30,025,000 tons. It exported 28,883,000 tons of oil in 2000, up 38.8% from 20,813,000 tons in 1999. Production in 2001 has been growing at roughly 20%, on target to meet the government's forecast of 40,100,000 tons of oil (800,000 barrels per day). In 2000, production reached 11.5 km³ of natural gas, up from 8.2 km³ in 1999.

Kazakhstan has the potential to be a world-class oil exporter in the medium term. The landmark foreign investment in Kazakhstan is the TengizChevroil joint venture, owned 50% by ChevronTexaco, 25% by ExxonMobil, 20% by KazMunaiGas of Kazakhstan, and 5% by LukArco of Russia. The Karachaganak natural gas and gas condensate field is being developed by BG, Agip, ChevronTexaco, and Lukoil. The Agip-led Offshore Kazakhstan Consortium has discovered potentially huge Kashagan oil field in the northern Caspian. Kazakhstan's economic future is linked to oil and gas development. GDP growth will depend on the price of oil, as well as the ability to develop new deposits.

January 2022 began with thousands of people returning to the streets of Kazakhstan to protest against the surging gas prices, recording four straight days of demonstrations, which is claimed to be the biggest protests to have taken place in the oil-rich country in decades. Protesters invaded into government buildings and took over police vehicles despite a strict emergency led by the state being in place.

Mining

Kazakhstan is a leading producer of many mineral commodities, including salt, uranium, ferrochrome, titanium sponge, cadmium, potash, magnesium, rhenium, copper, bauxite, gallium and zinc.

The country was the world's largest producer of uranium in 2018. In 2019, the country was the world's 10th largest producer of gold; 11th largest world producer of copper; 3rd largest worldwide producer of chromium; 9th largest world producer of bauxite; 9th largest world producer of zinc; 10th largest worldwide producer of antimony; 12th largest world producer of iron ore; 12th largest world producer of lead; 14th largest world producer of manganese; 17th largest world producer of phosphate; 6th largest world producer of bismuth, and the 7th largest world producer of sulfur.

Industry

Motor cars
In June 2014 the CKD (Complete Knock-Down) assembly of Toyota Fortuner was launched in Kostanay, Kazakhstan. The expected annual output makes around 3,000 cars.

The Kazakhstan's car industry was developing rapidly in 2014 producing US$2 billion worth of products annually. Unfortunately, the industry experienced a decline despite high hopes, with sales dwindling to only 46,000 in 2016.

In 2020, the Kazakh economy observed the biggest growth in its automotive industry, which saw a 53.6% growth, despite the COVID-19 pandemic.

Rail
GE Transportation acquired 50% stake in Lokomotiv Kurastyru Zauyty in a joint venture with Kazakhstan's national railway company Temir Zholy.

Services

Technology
On 22 December 2014 the World Bank approved an US$88 million loan that would support Kazakhstan's efforts to facilitate commercially and socially viable innovation in technology. The Fostering Productive Innovation Project aims to improve the country in areas that are able to foster and support technological innovation.

Retail
According to A.T. Kearney's 2015 Global Retail Development Index, Kazakhstan ranked 13 out of 30. In the 2016th Index, Kazakhstan ranked as the 4th best developing country for retail investments, scoring 56.5 out of 100. Kazakhstan's market attracted large international retailers, such as French retail chains Carrefour and Leroy Merlin, as well as food giants McDonald's and KFC.

Tourism

Gambling
Gambling in Kazakhstan was developing already during the day of Czarist Russia, then lotteries were organized. In 1698, Czar Peter I signed a decree which allowed organized lotteries for the first time. In later years lotteries were organized by the Ministry of Finance of the Union of Soviet Socialist Republics, which included Kazakhstan.

The Ministry of Finance of the Republic of Kazakhstan started issuing licenses for gambling activity in 1999.

In 2007 the government of Kazakhstan has introduced a new law which ordered banning gambling on the territory of Kazakhstan besides 2 places which were to become the examples of Russia's special gambling zones. Casinos existing outside these areas had to be closed or moved to places where they could operate legally. The first legal casino opened after the introduction of new law was Casino Flamingo in Kapchagay, which was opened on 1 October 2008.

In 2018, the income of gambling companies in Kazakhstan amounted to ₸19.5 billion. This is 16.1% more than in 2017. Then this amount was at the level of ₸16.8 billion.

External trade and investment

Trade

Kazakhstan has 11 transcontinental routes, including rail and road routes, and many oil and gas pipelines. The country's geographic position allows for the transporting of goods from China to Europe three to four times faster than other routes.

Sherin Suzhikova, Counselor of Kazakhstan's Chamber of Commerce and Industry and Chao Yon-chuan, Secretary-General of the Taiwan External Trade Development Council (TAITRA), signed an agreement on 13 October 2006 in Taipei to improve economic relations through "exchanges of market information and visits by trade professionals." TAITRA has an office in Almaty, Kazakhstan.

In 2006, North Dakota's then Lieutenant Governor Jack Dalrymple led an 18-member delegation of the North Dakota Trade Office representing seven North Dakota companies and Dickinson State University on a trip to Kazakhstan, Ukraine and Russia. North Dakota exports mostly machinery to Kazakhstan, the eighth largest destination for North Dakotan exports; machinery exports increased from US$22,000 to US$25 million between 2000 and 2005.

The percentage of high-tech exports (as a share of manufactured exports) from Kazakhstan has grown from just 4.46% in 1995 to 37.17% in 2014. One of the main factors that triggered this growth was the Technology Commercialization Project developed and implemented by the World Bank Group and the Kazakh Government. Through this project, 65 Kazakh tech startups received funding and training helping them get their innovations into markets.

China is Kazakhstan's important trade partner. In late March 2015 the two countries signed 33 deals worth US$23.6 billion. The deals cover different industries, such as oil refining, cars, steel.

Kazakhstan's foreign trade turnover in 2018 comprised $93.5trn that is 19.7% more compared to 2017. The volume of export in the reporting period made $67trn (+25.7%) and import was $32.5trn (+9.9%).

The Government of Kazakhstan has been supporting Kazakhstani exporters operating in foreign markets through their QazTrade incubator. Since September 2019, the program selects businesses and assists them with navigating bureaucracy and connecting to foreign markets the government deems a priority, including Germany, Turkey, the United Arab Emirates, Iran, and China.

National investment strategy
The Kazakh government approved in August 2017 a national investment strategy, which seeks to increase foreign investments by 26% in five years and create a more favorable investment climate. The strategy also identified 27 countries as the most important sources investments. These countries include the US, UK, China, Russia, Germany, France, Italy, Turkey, Japan, the UAE, South Korea and others. The Ministry for Investment and Development works with Ministry of Foreign Affairs to develop individual plans of actions for each country.

In order to achieve the 26% growth of FDI, Kazakhstan executes economic diplomacy. Key actors of Kazakhstan's foreign economic policy are the Ministry of Foreign Affairs, Ministry of Trade and Integration of Kazakhstan, KazakhInvest and Qaztrade.

Foreign direct investment
Kazakhstan is the largest recipient of total and annual foreign direct investment of all CIS countries.
The OECD has recognized the strides the government has made in opening the country to international investment and in improving the policy framework for investment as part of their efforts to diversify the economy. In 2017 Kazakhstan was invited by OECD to become Adherent to the OECD Declaration on International Investment and Multinational Enterprises.

In June 2014 Kazakhstan's president, Nursultan Nazarbayev, signed into law tax concessions to promote foreign investment, including a 10-year exemption from corporation tax, an 8-year exemption from property tax, and a 10-year freeze on most other taxes. Other measures include a refund on capital investments of up to 30 percent once a production facility is in operation. In order to attract investment, Kazakhstan lowered the tax burden for foreign investors. The corporate income tax rate dropped from 30% to 20%. The government also gradually reduced VAT from 16% in 2006 to 12% in 2009.

As of 30 September 2014, total foreign investment in Kazakhstan reached US$211.5 billion. Of that total, net foreign Direct Investment constituted US$129.3 billion, with portfolio and other investments comprising the remaining US$82.2 billion.

Reflecting Kazakhstan's ambitious FDI roadmap, a three-year goal to increase FDI by US$30 billion by 2025 was announced.

As of July 2015, Kazakhstan attracted US$16 billion in the manufacturing industry over the past five years, which is 2.5 times more than over the previous five years. Kazakhstan put into operation four hundred new products, such as car industry, railway engineering, manufacture of basic chemical products, uranium industry, the industry of rare earth metals. The volume of new enterprises amounted to ₸580 billion.

In June 2015 – June 2016 the total number of enterprises owned by foreign investors in Kazakhstan increased by 2.3 percent and reached 9,000. 8,691 foreign companies operating in the Kazakhstan are small businesses.

As of the beginning of 2016, the World Bank invested over US$6.8 billion in Kazakhstan since 1992. These funds were invested in development of roads and social infrastructure, increasing of competitiveness of SME's, education, healthcare, environment protection, etc.

In 2012, Kazakhstan conducted the first review of the OECD investment standards, which resulted in 12 recommendations on how to improve the investment climate of the country. After adopting Law on public – private partnership that extends the use of the mechanism and revising standards of intellectual property protection and the rules of attracting foreign labor, Kazakhstan started a second review of the OECD in 2016.

According to Ministry of Investment and Development of Kazakhstan, as of May 2016, attraction of foreign investment in oil refining increased by 80%, food industry – 30%, in engineering – by 7 times. The Ministry also reported that there were 200 investment projects in country worth more than $40 billion.

In mid-2016 a group of companies led by Chevron announced a US$36.8 billion investment in Kazakhstan's Tengiz oil field.

In the first quarter of 2016, Kazakhstan attracted US$2.7 billion in foreign direct investment. The largest investor in the Kazakh economy is the Netherlands ($66 billion), followed by the United States (US$26 billion) and Switzerland (US$15 billion). According to the Chairman of Kazakhstan National Bank, a key factor triggering the increased inflow of foreign investment is implementation of the Nurly Zhol state programme that provides for the creation of favourable conditions. As of September 2016, foreign investments in the Kazakh economy totalled US$5.7 billion, which is 4,8% more than during the same period of the previous year.

Summarizing 2016, Kazakhstan's Foreign Minister Erlan Idrissov noted that Kazakhstan attracted US$20 billion of foreign direct investment during the year. The gross inflow of foreign direct investment in 2016 grew by 40% compared to 2015 and surpassed the previous record of 2008. The number of foreign businesses operating in Kazakhstan increased 25% in 2016 compared to 2015. The main recipients of foreign direct investment were the mining industry, geological exploration and processing. The top four investors include the Netherlands, the United States, Switzerland and France.

Kazakhstan introduced a visa-free regime for citizens of EAEU, OECD, Monaco, Malaysia, United Arab Emirates, and Singapore starting from 2017. The visa-free entry is expected to increase cooperation with investors and businesses of these countries.

Agriculture is one of Kazakhstan's most important sectors where the country seeks to attract foreign investments to boost the competitiveness of this sector of economy. To that end, in 2017 KazAgro negotiated with the European Investment Bank (EIB) a €200 million loan for a period of 15 years.

Kazakhstan attracted $330 billion in foreign direct investment from more than 120 countries since 1991 until 2019. More than 50% of FDI in Kazakhstan was directed from the European Union (EU). 15%, or $48.4 billion, of FDI originated from the United States, and 5% from the United Kingdom and China each. President Tokayev set foreign investment attraction as a priority in his 2 September 2019 state-of-the-nation address. In 2018, Kazakhstan attracted $24 billion of foreign direct investments. The Foreign Ministry of Kazakhstan plays an important role in attracting foreign investors to the country.

In 2019, gross FDI inflow to Kazakhstan amounted to US$24.1 billion. In 2019, mining and metallurgy accounted for the largest volume of foreign investment – 56.3%. The industry attracted record US$13.586 billion in foreign investment. Manufacturing and trade were second and third most attractive sectors for investors. US$3.5 billion of FDI was directed into the manufacturing industry, while trade attracted $3 billion in 2019.

The top five countries investing the most into the economy of Kazakhstan remained unchanged in 2019. The Netherlands invested $7.3 billion in Kazakhstan (30.2%), followed by the USA — $5.5 billion (23.0%) and Switzerland — $2.2 billion. China outran the Russian Federation in terms of investments and took 4th place with $1.7 billion (7.0%), while the Russian Federation closed the top five with $1.4 billion (5.8%) invested in Kazakhstan.

Noteworthy that Kazakhstan's gross inflow of FDI increased 15.8 percent per year in 2018 and remained at the level of US$24 billion from 2019, even though world economies saw a decrease in investment during that time period.

13 Kazakhstan's regions out of 14 saw investment growth in 2020, despite the COVID-19 pandemic. High growth of investment was in the construction sector, specifically in Turkestan region and Zhambyl region as well as Shymkent city.

Investor support
Kazakhstan's investment environment is defined by the government's support for foreign investors. To increase the FDI inflow, the country established the Kazakh Invest National Company, or Kazakh Invest for short. It is a one-stop shop for investors that facilitates investment projects' implementation process from an idea to implementation, as well as ensures aftercare services. In 2018, Kazakh Invest helped develop more than 70 investment proposals in a variety of industries: metallurgy, petrochemistry, food industry, tourism and other. It included creating a business plan, financial model and teaser development.

In order to facilitate foreign investment, Kazakhstan launched in 2020 an online portal elicense.kz, which allows to conclude investment contracts online reducing red tape. The first agreement that was concluded via the portal was between Kaz Solar 50 and the German company Solarnet Investment GmbH for a renewable energy project worth ₸5 billion.

Intellectual property

In 2015 Kazakhstan passed a law to regulate Intellectual Property, patent law, and copyright protections and bring its legislation into line with the European Patent Convention (1994 revision) and the 2006 Singapore Treaty.

Public policy

2015 "Nurly Zhol" economic policy
On 11 November 2014 in his address to the nation for 2015, Nazarbayev proclaimed Kazakhstan's New Economic Policy – The Path to the Future (Nurly Zhol). The new economic policy implies large-scale state investment in infrastructure over the next several years. In the short term, the program "Nurly Zhol" will apply the anti-crisis measures to overcome the turbulence in the global economy. The long-term measures of the state program of infrastructure development will help to create a strong platform for new growth.

Kazakhstan has identified five priorities for modernization of the state and the economy to maintain competitiveness in the Fourth Industrial Revolution.

Kazakhstan was ranked 36th in the Ease of Doing Business report released by the World Bank Group in 2018. The report's rankings rate ease of regulations for businesses and strength of property rights.

The Heritage Foundation, a Washington DC – based research center, ranked Kazakhstan 41st in its Index of Economic Freedom 2018. Its overall score has increased by 0.1 point, still being only "moderately free" with significant improvements in investment freedom and government integrity offsetting steep declines in fiscal health and monetary freedom.

Kazakhstan aimed in 2017 to boost its economy by attracting private investors interested in developing national companies. This is the main goal of privatization that is expected to decrease the share of public property to 15% of GDP. Such companies as Kazakhstan Railways, Samruk-Energo, Kazatomprom, Kaspost, KazMunayGas and Air Astana are expected to be sold through IPO.

Kazakhstan fell from 32nd to the 38th place in the 2018 IMD World Competitiveness ranking. The report evaluates business efficiency, public finance and domestic economy.

Privatisation 2016–2020
In December 2015, Kazakhstan Government approved new privatization plan for 2016 – 2020. It is a large-scale privatization program that continues the privatization of 2014 and includes 60 major state-owned companies. According to Kazakh Finance ministry, the state budget got ₸6.99 billion (US$20.6 million) from the deals reached within the 2014–2016 privatization program as of 20 Sept. 2016. Kazakhstan's privatization program aims to reduce the state participation in the economy to 15 percent, which is the level set for countries of the OECD.

Special Economic Zones
A Special Economic Zone (SEZ) is a part of Kazakhstan's territory, which has a special legal regime, with all the necessary infrastructure, to carry out priority activities.

On the territory of the Republic of Kazakhstan, there are 12 special economic zones with different sectoral orientations:
 SEZ "Astana – New City"
 SEZ "Saryarka"
 SEZ "National Industrial Petrochemical Technopark"
 SEZ "Seaport Aktau"
 SEZ "Ontustik"
 SEZ "Chemical Park Taraz"
 SEZ "Khorgos – East Gate"
 SEZ "Park of Innovative Technologies"
 SEZ "Pavlodar"
 SEZ "Astana – Technopolis"
 SEZ "Turkistan"
 SEZ "ICBC" Khorgos"

Small and medium-sized enterprises
A new program to support small businesses was launched in Kazakhstan in February 2015. 2015 is expected to be a pilot period of the program. During that period the initiative will be focused on three major areas, notably agribusiness, machinery building and production of construction materials, and is to be further extended to other industries.

In May 2015 the European Bank for Reconstruction and Development (EBRD) agreed to provide €41 million for technical cooperation projects, advisory support to small and medium-sized enterprises (SMEs), and to introduce a Women in Business program.

In 2016 the number of Kazakhstan's telecom start-ups increased by 10% compared to 2015. Around 9,400 small telecom companies are currently registered in the country.

The Kazakh Government provides extensive support to businesses, especially SMEs. The development of SMEs is an integral part of Kazakhstan's Business Road Map 2020 state programme. The share of SMEs in Kazakhstan's GDP increased from 24.9% in 2015 to 28.4% in 2018. Kazakhstan plans to raise this indicator to 50% by 2050.

Recent miscellany
Kazakhstan was ranked 54th 2017 Economic Freedom of the World report published by Fraser Institute, but ranks 12 places below on place 66 when adjusted by the Gender Disparity Index, which captures the degree to which women around the world have the same legal rights as men and adjusts the economic freedom score accordingly. This shows a large disadvantage of women in business.

In recent years a trade route has been established between Kazakhstan and the United States. It now makes up 54% of the World's salt imports and exports by volume (350,000 tonnes per year).

In 2021, 14 products developed by Kazakh scientists began being exported to China, Russia, Turkey, Georgia, Kyrgyzstan, and the Czech Republic. These products include, but are not limited to, food & drinks based on milk whey; probiotics; an anti-fungal drug; biological sanitation products.

In 2021, it was reported that the number of young female entrepreneurs in Kazakhstan has increased by 15 percent.

See also
Yerbolat Dosayev, Minister of National Economy
Vladimir Shkolnik, Minister of Energy

References

External links

 World Bank Summary Trade Statistics Kazakhstan
 U.S. Department of Energy Country Analysis Brief
 Kazakhstan Plans to Build Highway Connecting China and Europe
 Kazakh central bank misspells 'bank' on money
 International Business; China Pays Dearly for Kazakhstan Oil
 Kazakh President's Daughter Chides Steel Baron Mittal
 Commercial gold and copper discoveries in Kazakhstan
 Kazakhstan Changes Energy Strategy on the Way to WTO
 Kazakhstan to be top oil producer by 2011: Nazarbayev
 "Agriculture in Kazakhstan"
 Tariffs applied by Kazakhstan as provided by ITC's ITC Market Access Map, an online database of customs tariffs and market requirements